Sir Francis Kynaston or Kinaston (1587–1642) was an English lawyer, courtier, poet and politician  who sat in the House of Commons from 1621 to 1622. He is noted for his translation of Geoffrey Chaucer's Troilus and Criseyde into Latin verse (as rime royal, Amorum Troili et Creseidae Libri Quinque, 1639). He also made a Latin translation of Henryson's The Testament of Cresseid.

Life

Kynaston was born at Oteley Park, near Ellesmere, Shropshire, the eldest son of Sir Edward Kynaston and his wife Isabel Bagenall, daughter of Sir Nicholas Bagenall. His father was High Sheriff of Shropshire in 1599. On 11 December 1601 Kynaston matriculated at Oriel College, Oxford. He graduated B.A. from St Mary Hall on 14 June 1604 and M.A. at Oxford on 11 November 1611. He was called to the bar at Lincoln's Inn in 1611.  He was knighted by James I at Theobalds on 21 December 1618.

In 1621 Kynaston was elected Member of Parliament for Shropshire. He became esquire of the body to Charles I on the King's accession in 1625.

At court Kynaston was the centre of a literary coterie. In 1635 he founded an academy of learning, called the Musæum Minervæ, for which he obtained a licence under the great seal, a grant of arms, and a common seal; Charles also contributed from the treasury. On 27 February 1636 Prince Charles, the Duke of York, and others visited the museum, and a masque by Kynaston, entitled Corona Minervæ, was performed in their presence. In July of the same year Sir George Peckham bequeathed money to the institution.

Shortly after this, Kynaston was preoccupied with a certain ‘hanging furnace,’ recommended by him to the lords of the admiralty for ships of war.

Kynaston died in 1642, and was buried at Oteley. The museum appears to have perished with the death of its founder. Its site was marked by Kynaston's Alley, Bedfordbury.

Kynaston married Margaret Lee, daughter of Sir Humphry Lee, 1st Baronet of Langley, in 1613. They had one son, Edward (c. 1613 – 1656), and four daughters - Frances (b. 1612), Rachel, Ann (d. 1642) and Barbara (d. 1619).

Works

Kynaston published a translation of Chaucer's ‘Troilus and Cressida,’ with a commentary, prefaced by fifteen short poems by Oxford writers, including William Strode and Dudley Digges (Oxford, 1635). Kynaston also contributed to the Musæ Aulicæ by Arthur Johnston, a rendering in English verse of Johnston's Latin poems, London, 1635, and was author of an heroic romance in verse, Leoline and Sydanis, containing some of the legendary history of Wales and Anglesey, published with Cynthiades: Sonnets to his Mistresse (technically not precisely of the sonnet form) addressed by Kynaston to his mistress under the name of Cynthia (London, 1642).

Notes

References
Attribution

Further reading
 G. H. Turnbull, Samuel Hartlib's connection with Sir Francis Kynaston's 'Musaeum Minervae' . Notes and Queries, 197 (1952), 33-7. Publisher: Oxford University Press. .
 Cesare Cuttica, Sir Francis Kynaston: The importance of the ‘Nation’ for a 17th-century English royalist, History of European Ideas, Volume 32, Issue 2, June 2006, Pages 139-161.

External links
Amorum Troili et Creseidae Libri Quinque
Testamentum Creseidae (1639)
Survey of London vol. 36

1587 births
1642 deaths
16th-century English poets
Alumni of Oriel College, Oxford
English MPs 1621–1622
17th-century English writers
17th-century English male writers
English male poets
People from Ellesmere, Shropshire
Lawyers from the Kingdom of England